Tentaculita is an extinct class of uncertain placement ranging from the Early Ordovician to the Middle Jurassic. They were suspension feeders with a near worldwide distribution.  For a more thorough discussion, see Tentaculites.

The presence of perforate septa and "septal necks" has been used to argue for a cephalopod affinity, whereas the shell microstructure, notably the presence of punctae, points to a brachiopod relationship.

Subdivisions 
 Subclasses
Chonioconarida

Orders
Cornulitida
Microconchida
Tentaculitida
Trypanoporida

Genera
Anticalyptraea

Lindstroemiella

References

 Farsan, N. M. (1994). Tentaculiten: Ontogenese, Systematik, Phylogenese, Biostratonomie und Morphologie. Abhandlungen der Senckenbergischen Naturforschenden Gesellschaft 547: 1-128.

Further reading
 The Paleobiology Database

 
Early Ordovician first appearances
Middle Jurassic extinctions